Tekedra Mawakana is an American businesswoman and lawyer who currently serves as co-chief executive officer of Waymo. Previously, she was the company's chief operating officer, and prior employers have included Steptoe & Johnson, AOL, Yahoo!, and eBay. Mawakana has served on the boards of the Consumer Technology Association, the Global Network Initiative, the Internet Association, Boom Supersonic, Operator Collective, and Intuit.

Early life and education
Tekedra Mawakana was born in the U.S. state of Mississippi and later resided in Georgia, Texas, and Virginia.

Mawakana is a Doctor of Law. She received her Bachelor of Arts degree in political science from Trinity Washington University in 1993, before earning her Juris Doctor from Columbia Law School.

Career
Mawakana began her career at Steptoe & Johnson, an international law firm based in Washington, D.C., where she focused on intellectual property and telecommunication. She then held a corporate counsel position at the "mid-size Washington-area" telecommunications company Startec Global Communications. Mawakana later held policy roles in legal departments at AOL and Yahoo! She worked at AOL for approximately twelve years before becoming Yahoo!'s deputy general counsel in 2013, where she led the Washington, D.C. office and efforts to combat mass surveillance. She then served as eBay's head of global government relations for 14 months, starting in 2016.

Mawakana joined Waymo as vice president of public policy and government affairs in 2017. In this role, she focused on expanding autonomous driving testing, regulation, and competition with traditional automobile manufacturers. Mawakana was promoted to chief operating officer in 2019, overseeing the company's communications and marketing, business development and operations, corporate social responsibility, and public relations and policy. Mawakana has served as co-chief executive officer (CEO) of Waymo since April 2021. Her role focuses on business, while co-CEO Dmitri Dolgov concentrates on technology. In 2021, Pete Bigelow of Automotive News said the duo have a "somewhat unusual power-sharing arrangement", and have "developed a close working relationship and have been heavily involved in Waymo's most high-profile milestones". She is the second Black woman to head a self-driving technology company.

Board service and recognition
Mawakana serves on the Consumer Technology Association's board of industry leaders, on Boom Supersonic's advisory council, and Intuit's board of directors. She is also on the advisory board of the investment company Operator Collective, as well as the board of advocacy group Saving Promise, which works to prevent domestic violence. Mawakana has also served as chairperson of the Internet Association and on the board of the Global Network Initiative.

In 2015, Mawakana was included in Washingtonian magazine's list of "100 Top Tech Leaders", in which she was noted for her work at Yahoo! to "protect the privacy of users" against surveillance by the National Security Agency. She was included in Automotive News 2020 list of "100 leading women" in the North American automotive industry for her work at Waymo.

Personal life
Mawakana lives in California.

See also
 List of Columbia Law School alumni

References

External links

 

Living people
African-American business executives
African-American women in business
American chief executives
American chief operating officers
American women chief executives
AOL employees
Columbia Law School alumni
EBay employees
People from California
People from Mississippi
People from Washington, D.C.
Trinity Washington University alumni
Waymo employees
Yahoo! employees
Year of birth missing (living people)
21st-century African-American people
21st-century African-American women